Colonel Quaritch, V.C.: A Tale of Country Life is an 1888 novel by H Rider Haggard.

Reception

Gary Westfahl described Colonel Quaritch, V.C. as "feeble".

References

External links
Complete book at Project Gutenberg
 
Images and bibliographic information for various editions of Colonel Quaritch, V.C. at SouthAfricaBooks.com

Novels by H. Rider Haggard
1888 British novels